New Spring   is a fantasy novel by American author Robert Jordan, a prequel in the Wheel of Time series. New Spring consists of 26 chapters and an epilogue.

Background to publication
"New Spring" was originally published as a novella in the speculative fiction anthology edited by Robert Silverberg entitled Legends: Short Novels by the Masters of Modern Fantasy. Published by Tor Books, this anthology was released on 15 September 1999, between the 1998 publication of The Path of Daggers (Book 8 of The Wheel of Time) and 2000 publication of Winter's Heart (Book 9).

Robert Jordan later expanded the novella into a standalone novel (though of significantly shorter length than typical Wheel of Time books), which was then published by Tor Books in January 2004, between the 2003 publication of Crossroads of Twilight (Book 10) and the 2005 publication of Knife of Dreams (Book 11).

The New Spring novel was originally conceived of as the first in a trilogy of prequel novels. The second and third were to focus on Tam serving in the Illianer army and finding Rand, and Moiraine and Lan's journeys and discoveries to reach the Two Rivers just before the events of the first novel. Jordan's original plan was to write the trilogy before books 11 and 12 of the main series, but he was disappointed with New Spring'''s reception and decided to postpone this until after the main series was completed. However, his death on 16 September 2007—before the completion of the final novel in the series—makes this highly unlikely.

The first paperback edition of New Spring, released on 13 June 2005, gave readers the first look at Knife of Dreams (Book 11), as it featured an advance excerpt of part of the prologue of Knife of Dreams.

Plot summaryNew Spring describes events that take place twenty years before the events of The Eye of the World (Book 1). The story begins in the last days of the Aiel War, and the Battle of the Shining Walls around Tar Valon. It is set primarily in Tar Valon and the Borderlands, specifically Kandor.New Spring focuses mainly on Moiraine Damodred and Siuan Sanche, two Aes Sedai new to the sisterhood, and how a young Moiraine became Aes Sedai, met Lan Mandragoran and made him her Warder. The novel also explains how Moiraine and Siuan witnessed a prophecy of the Dragon's rebirth and came to begin investigating the Karaethon Cycle'', the Prophecies of the Dragon, decades before discovering Rand al'Thor.

Graphic novel
It is also the first of Jordan's works to be adapted to graphic novel format. Issue #1 was published in July 2005. It ran eight issues total. It was produced by DB Pro, who previously adapted "The Legend of Huma" by Richard A. Knaak and "The Hedge Knight" by George R. R. Martin and published by Red Eagle Entertainment.

The comics are adapted by Chuck Dixon, drawn by Mike S. Miller, colored by Etienne St Laurent, edited by Ernst Dabel, lettered by Artmonkeys, with design by Bill Tortolini.

All eight issues were collected and re-released together as a single graphic novel in January 2011. It includes extra bonus material of developmental art, script pages, and correspondence between Jordan and Dixon.

References

External links
 Official site from Tor Books
  (hardcover)
  (paperback)

Prequel novels
1999 American novels
2004 American novels
American fantasy novels
The Wheel of Time books
Novels by Robert Jordan
Tor Books books